Sean Greenhalgh is a music producer and multi-instrumentalist best known as the drummer in the band Clap Your Hands Say Yeah. Sean is featured in The Warhol Economy: How Fashion Art & Music Drive New York City in regard to Clap Your Hands Say Yeah's rise to blog fame in 2005.

References

External links 
 Sean Greenhalgh Music Production
 the personal and private  songs of S. Izdat
 Takka Takka
 RadicalDads/ Radical dads
 Conversion party

Living people
Male drummers
American rock drummers
Year of birth missing (living people)